Flavopunctelia darrowii is a species of foliose lichen in the family Parmeliaceae. It was first formally described as a new species by John Walter Thomson in 1950 as Parmelia darrowi. It is named after American botanist Robert Arthur Darrow. In 1982, Hildur Krog transferred it to the subgenus Flavopunctelia of her newly circumscribed genus Punctelia, created to contain Parmelia species with punctate (point-like) pseudocyphellae. Mason Hale raised this subgenus to generic status a couple of years later.

The lichen is endemic to the American oak-pine forests of southern Arizona and higher elevations in Chihuahua and Sonora, Mexico.

References

darrowii
Lichen species
Lichens described in 1950
Lichens of Mexico
Lichens of North America